The term Whoreson can refer to

Bastard (law of England and Wales) - Bastardy law in England
Whoreson - a 1972 novel by Donald Goines